Raphael Brütsch (born 3 August 1971) is a Swiss curler.

Brütsch started playing curling in 1984. He is right-handed.

References

External links
 

1971 births
Living people
Swiss male curlers
Place of birth missing (living people)
21st-century Swiss people